Adam Richard Rippon (born November 11, 1989) is an American figure skater. He won the 2010 Four Continents Championships and the 2016 U.S. National Championships. Earlier in his career, he won the 2008 and 2009 World Junior Championships, the 2007–2008 Junior Grand Prix Final, and the 2008 U.S junior national title. Rippon was selected to represent the United States at the 2018 Winter Olympics in Pyeongchang, South Korea.

At the 2018 Winter Olympics, Rippon won a bronze medal as part of the figure skating team event. Later that year, he won season 26 of Dancing with the Stars with professional dancer Jenna Johnson. Rippon announced his retirement from competitive figure skating in November 2018. He was included in Time magazine's 100 Most Influential People of 2018.

Early life
Adam Rippon was born on November 11, 1989, in Scranton, Pennsylvania, the first child in his family of six children. His parents divorced in 2004. He attended an elementary Catholic school called "Our Lady of Peace".

Career

Early career
Rippon started to skate when he was ten years old; his mother skated and brought him along to the rink. He was coached by Yelena Sergeeva from 2000 to 2007.

In the 2004–2005 season, Rippon won the silver medal at the Novice level at the 2005 U.S. Championships. After Nationals he was assigned a spring international assignment, Triglav Trophy in Slovenia 2005, and competed in the Junior division, finishing first and winning the gold medal. In the 2005–06 season, he debuted on the ISU Junior Grand Prix circuit. He competed at the 2005–06 ISU Junior Grand Prix event in Croatia and placed 6th. At the 2006 U.S. Championships, he finished 11th at the junior level. In the 2006–2007 season, Rippon did not compete on the Junior Grand Prix circuit. He placed 6th on the junior level at the 2007 U.S. Championships. Following the event, he left Sergeeva and began working with Nikolai Morozov in February 2007 at the Ice House in Hackensack, New Jersey.

2007–2008 season
In the 2007–2008 season, Rippon competed on the 2007–2008 ISU Junior Grand Prix circuit. At his first event, the Harghita Cup in Miercurea Ciuc, Romania, he won the gold medal. He then won the silver medal at the Sofia Cup in Sofia, Bulgaria. These two medals qualified him for the ISU Junior Grand Prix Final. At that event, Rippon won the gold medal, and became the first man to break 200 points at a Junior level competition.

He went on to the 2008 U.S. Championships, where he won the Junior title. The Professional Skaters Association recognized Rippon as having the best men's free skate at the National Championships and was awarded the EDI Award. He earned a trip to the 2008 Junior Worlds, where he won the gold medal after finishing first in both segments.

2008–2009 season
Rippon moved up to the senior level in the 2008–2009 season. In the Grand Prix season he was assigned to compete at the 2008 Skate America where he placed eighth and the 2008 Cup of Russia where he placed third in the short program and fifth overall. In late November 2008, Rippon left Morozov. In December 2008, he moved to Toronto, Ontario, Canada, to begin training with Brian Orser at the Toronto Cricket, Skating & Curling Club. Rippon officially announced his coaching change on January 2, 2009.

At the 2009 U.S. Championships, his senior-level national debut, he placed seventh. He was named to the team for the 2009 Junior World Championships. At Junior Worlds, in his two programs, he landed a total of three 3A jumps, one in combination with a 2T. He won the competition, scoring 222.00 points and becoming the first single skater to win two World Junior titles.

2009–2010 season
Rippon sprained his ankle during the summer and missed some training time. For the 2009–2010 season, Rippon was assigned to two Grand Prix events. At the 2009 Trophée Eric Bompard, he placed third in both segments of the competition and was awarded the bronze medal. At the 2009 NHK Trophy, he finished 6th after placing 8th in the short and 5th in the free.

At the 2010 U.S. Championships, Rippon finished 5th overall after ranking 4th in both segments. He had a fall on his step sequence in the short program. Following the event, he was named as a second alternate for the 2010 Winter Olympics and 2010 World Championships, and assigned to the 2010 Four Continents Championships. At Four Continents, he placed 7th in the short program and first in the free skate, winning the gold medal. He was included in the U.S. team to Worlds after other skaters withdrew; he placed 7th in the short program, 5th in the free skate, and 6th overall.

2010–2011 season
Rippon began his season at the Japan Open, where he finished ahead of Daisuke Takahashi and Evgeni Plushenko. His assigned Grand Prix events for the 2010–2011 ISU Grand Prix season were the 2010 Skate Canada International and the 2010 Skate America. In Canada, Rippon had a collision with Patrick Chan during the morning practice before the short program but stated, "That was definitely the most exciting collision, maybe not the most dangerous." He won the bronze medal after placing third in the short and second in the free skate. At the 2010 Skate America, Rippon placed third in the short program, 7th in the free skate, and 4th overall.

At the 2011 U.S. Championships, Rippon finished 5th and was assigned to the 2011 Four Continents Championships, where he had the same result.

On June 16, 2011, Rippon announced he was leaving Canada and returning to train in the US at the Detroit Skating Club in Bloomfield Hills, Michigan, home of his DSC-based choreographer Pasquale Camerlengo and began training under the charge of Jason Dungjen.

2011–2012 season
In the 2011–2012 season, Rippon was assigned to 2011 Skate Canada and 2011 Trophée Eric Bompard as his Grand Prix events. He opened the season with a 4th-place finish at Skate Canada. This competition marked Rippon's first attempt at including a quad jump in his free program.  At Trophée Bompard, he was 4th in the short program, 3rd in the long, and finished 4th overall. Rippon won the silver medal at the 2012 U.S. Championships. He finished 4th at Four Continents and 13th at Worlds.

2012–2013 season
In September 2012, Rippon announced a coaching change, moving to train with Rafael Arutyunyan in Lake Arrowhead, California. At the 2012 Cup of China, Rippon collided with China's Song Nan – who sustained a concussion and withdrew – a minute into the final warm up before the free skate. Rippon said, "I kind of turned around to go into a jump and I think when Nan Song and I saw each other we both tried to avoid each other, but we went in the same way and we went head first into each other." Rippon finished 4th at the event and 8th at the 2012 NHK Trophy. At the 2013 U.S. Championships, he landed three triple Axels and finished 5th. He was assigned to the 2013 Four Continents but withdrew after sustaining an ankle injury on February 2, 2013.

2013–2014 season
In October 2013, Rippon competed at the 2013 Skate America. He included a quad lutz in both his short and long programs. He set personal bests in both segments, capturing the silver medal and finishing as the top American over Max Aaron and Jason Brown. In November he competed for the NHK Trophy and posted a new ISU personal best in the short program 82.25 . He landed a quad toe-loop in both segments and finished fourth overall.

2014–2015 season
In October 2014, Rippon competed at the 2014 CS Finlandia Trophy finishing first in the free program and second overall. At the end of October he finished 7th in the free skate and 10th overall at the 2014 Skate Canada International. In November he finished 5th at the 2014 Trophee Eric Bompard after placing third in the free skate. It was a season plagued with equipment issues. Rippon adjusted his blade brand and mount, took on a new trainer to work with his team and met with renewed consistency at U.S. Championships, landing effortless triple axels and once again including a quad lutz in his short and long programs. He went on to win the free-skate portion of the competition and finished second overall with the silver medal. He was assigned to both the Four Continents team and the Worlds team.

2015–2016 season
Rippon won gold at the 2016 U.S. Championships.
He placed sixth at the 2016 World Championships in Boston with a lively program to a medley of Beatles tunes. The audience gave him a standing ovation.

2016–2017 season
After taking bronze at the 2016 CS U.S. Classic, Rippon won bronze at both of his Grand Prix competitions – the 2016 Skate America and 2016 Trophée de France. As a result, he qualified for the first time to the Grand Prix Final. He would finish 6th at the event in Marseille, France.

During an off-ice warmup on January 6, 2017, Rippon sprained his left ankle and fractured the fifth metatarsal bone in his left foot, resulting in his withdrawal from the 2017 U.S. Championships.

2017–2018 season

Starting his season strong with a bronze medal at 2017 CS Finlandia Trophy, Rippon then went on to win silver medals in both of his Grand Prix assignments, 2017 NHK Trophy and 2017 Skate America. His placements at these events qualified him for his second Grand Prix Final. During his free skate at Skate America, Rippon fell on his shoulder while executing a quad lutz, but he was able to continue with his performance without stopping. At the 2018 U.S. Championships, Rippon placed 4th.
On January 7, 2018, he was one of three men selected to represent USA in the 2018 Winter Olympics in Pyeongchang, South Korea. At the 2018 Winter Olympics, Rippon won a bronze medal in the figure skating team event as part of the U.S. team, which made him the United States’ first openly gay athlete to win a medal at the Winter Olympics. In the individual men's event, he placed 7th in the short and 10th in the free to place 10th overall.

On November 19, 2018, Rippon announced his retirement from competitive figure skating.

Coaching career
Rippon has been a second coach to Mariah Bell since the 2021-2022 season.

Dancing with the Stars
On April 13, 2018, Rippon was announced as one of the celebrities who would compete on season 26 of Dancing with the Stars. His professional partner was Jenna Johnson. Rippon, along with Johnson, won the competition.

Signature moves

Rippon's signature move is a 3Lz that he executes with both arms above his head, colloquially dubbed the "Rippon Lutz". He is capable of performing the 3Lz-2T-2Lo combination with one hand over his head in all three jumps (colloquially named the "'Tano Lutz" after Brian Boitano, who popularized the move).

Personal life
On October 2, 2015, Rippon publicly came out as gay.

In March 2018, Rippon appeared at the 90th Academy Awards red carpet wearing a harness designed by Moschino.

At the Time 100 Gala in April 2019, Rippon honored his mother, a single parent, for her inspiration and dedication to his success. He reminded people that success is not overnight: It requires dedication and the support of others. In addition to his mother, Kelly, he has a close relationship with his siblings.

In 2019, Rippon guest-hosted RuPaul's Drag Race season 11 "Ruveal" livestreams with reigning queen from season 10, Aquaria.

In 2019, Rippon appeared in Taylor Swift's "You Need to Calm Down" music video, which won the MTV Video Music Award for Video of the Year. He also appeared in Superfruit's "The Promise" music video.

In his memoir Beautiful on the Outside, Rippon revealed that, before coming out as gay, he briefly dated South Korean Olympic champion Yuna Kim while both were training in Toronto.

Rippon and his husband, Jussi-Pekka Kajaala, were married on December 31, 2021. The two met on Tinder in 2018.

Politics
In February 2018, Rippon raised concerns about Vice President Mike Pence being chosen to lead the US delegation to the 2018 Winter Olympics opening ceremony because of Pence's support of legislation and policies deemed hostile to gay people.

Rippon endorsed and campaigned for Elizabeth Warren in the 2020 Democratic Party presidential primaries.

In 2020, Rippon made a donation to The Okra Project, a charity aimed at helping underprivileged black transgender people. Russian skater Alexei Yagudin reacted to the donation with an Instagram post calling Rippon and people like him "mistakes of nature" and wishing them to die. Yagudin later deleted the post. Rippon criticized Yagudin for the comments and made another $1,000 donation, this time in Yagudin's name, to the same organization.

In 2022, Rippon criticized the International Olympic Committee (IOC) for selecting Beijing as the host city of the 2022 Winter Olympics. The athlete said that the IOC was rewarding China's "bad behaviour" on human rights instead of choosing hosting countries that are safe for all athletes to compete to "step up" on human rights.

Programs

Competitive highlights

GP: Grand Prix; CS: Challenger Series; JGP: Junior Grand Prix

2009–2010 to present

2002–2003 to 2008–2009

Detailed results

2009–2010 to present

At team events, medals awarded for team results only. ISU personal bests highlighted in bold.

2004–2005 to 2008–2009 (Junior)

 SP = Short program; FS = Free skating

Filmography

Notes

References

External links

 
 
 
 
 
 

1989 births
Living people
American male single skaters
Four Continents Figure Skating Championships medalists
Gay sportsmen
LGBT figure skaters
LGBT people from Pennsylvania
American LGBT sportspeople
People from Clarks Summit, Pennsylvania
Sportspeople from Scranton, Pennsylvania
World Junior Figure Skating Championships medalists
Figure skaters at the 2018 Winter Olympics
Olympic bronze medalists for the United States in figure skating
Medalists at the 2018 Winter Olympics
Dancing with the Stars (American TV series) winners
21st-century LGBT people